Sudamda-Dhandalpur is a pair of villages in the Surendranagar district of Gujarat state, western India.

History
Sudamda-Dhandalpur was a minor princely state of Jhalawar prant, which during the British Raj was handled by the colonial Eastern Kathiawar Agency.

References

External links
 Imperial Gazetteer on DSAL - Kathiawar

Villages in Surendranagar district
Princely states of Gujarat